Desmond's is a British television situation comedy broadcast by Channel 4 from 1989 to 1994. Conceived and co-written by Trix Worrell, and produced by Charlie Hanson and Humphrey Barclay, Desmond's stars Norman Beaton as barber Desmond Ambrose, whose shop is a gathering place for an assortment of local characters. The show is set in Peckham, London, and features a predominantly black British Guyanese cast. With 71 episodes, Desmond's became Channel 4's longest running sitcom in terms of episodes.

Notability
While the show was not the first black (or predominantly black) British television situation comedy (The Fosters, produced by London Weekend Television, aired 1976 –77), Desmond's was the first to be set mainly in the workplace, providing an insight into black family life different from what had been seen before on British television.

The characters had aspirations (Desmond to return to Guyana, Michael to run his own branch of the bank, Gloria to get a job in fashion, Sean to go to university) and were socially mobile. The vast majority of the crew were also black.

Characters
Much of the success of the show came from the dynamics and relationships both within the Ambrose family and the other characters in the show who spent time in the shop.

The Ambrose family
The Ambroses are the central family around which the show was built.

Desmond Ambrose (Norman Beaton) was the main character and owner of the barbershop named after him. His friends and family occasionally make reference to his poor barbering skills. Desmond constantly talked about retiring and returning home to Guyana for good, although Shirley was reluctant to go with him. In the spin-off Porkpie, it was revealed that Desmond had died (as Norman Beaton had died the previous year).
Shirley Ambrose (née Pleshette) (Carmen Munroe), Desmond's wife and mother of their three children, often solved the problems of the other characters. Shirley was the only member of the Ambrose family not to appear in an episode of the spin-off Porkpie as it was revealed that she had gone back to live in Guyana, in the series.
Michael Ambrose (Geff Francis), Desmond and Shirley's elder son, was an assistant bank manager, who later became a manager. Unlike the rest of the Ambrose family, he was not introduced until the second episode, when Shirley suggested that Desmond go to the bank and get a loan to renovate the shop.
Gloria Jeanette Elaine Ambrose (Kimberly Walker) was the only daughter of Desmond and Shirley. She had dreams of becoming a fashion writer.
Sean Ambrose (Justin Pickett) was the youngest child, who frequently rapped and was experienced with computers. He later went to university.

Other characters 
 Augustus Neapolitan Cleveland "Porkpie" Grant (Ram John Holder) was a childhood friend of Desmond's. His nickname derived from his habit of always wearing a pork pie hat, even as a young man back in Guyana. His wife Gwendolyn had left him many years earlier after catching him in bed with her best friend Hyacinth Green, who appeared in the final series. Porkpie's wife went to live in Canada, taking their two young daughters with her. Although he had two daughters he often talked about his daughter Denise, who appeared in the fifth episode of the third series, while there was no mention of his other daughter. Porkpie later had his own spin-off series, Porkpie.
 Matthew Joffor (Gyearbuor Asante) was an eternal student from The Gambia. He would often quote "old African sayings" and usually followed up by asking the listener to "think about it".
 Tony (Dominic Keating) was Desmond's first assistant barber and the third white character to appear in the series. In the final series, it is mentioned Tony had left to cut hair overseas.
 Ricky Flaxman (Dean Gatiss) was Tony's replacement in the final series. Desmond gave him the job as the new barber's assistant because he knew his father and promised him a favour for supplying an alibi. He moved into Gloria's room after she moved out to live with Alex. He is often referred to as "Small Boy" by Matthew.
 Lee "The Peckham Prince" Stanley (Robbie Gee) was the local wide-boy wheeler-dealer, often trying to sell his wares to the regulars in the shop. He was like a son to Desmond and Shirley as they looked after him while he was in care and they knew his mother. Lee's mother revealed the identity of his father in the fourth episode of the fourth series. She visited the barber shop to find Lee on the day he went to Liverpool to find her. On Lee's return to Peckham, he was reunited with his mother after 28 years.
 Louise Dixon (Lisa Geoghan) was Gloria's best friend in the first four series, and also the first white character to appear in the series. She went away to university between the fourth and fifth series.
 Amanda "Mandy" Mosgrove (Matilda Thorpe) was Michael's PA. In episode two of the sixth series, Michael proposed to her and she accepted. She was due to marry Michael towards the end of the series. There was no episode of them getting married as the series had finished during the planning stages of the wedding. In the spin-off series, Porkpie it was revealed that Mandy had married Michael, her surname having become Ambrose.
 Beverley McIntosh (Joan Ann Maynard) was a good friend of Shirley's, Michael's godmother and the local gossip, providing a prudish, old-fashioned viewpoint and always wore a hat that resembled a tea cosy. She often spoke about her ailments and the medication she had to take, as well as having to prepare her husband's Cuthbert's red mullet - which he later revealed, in his only appearance, that he did not like. The couple had four children: three sons and a daughter, Merlene.
 Doreen Wilma Pleshette (Mona Hammond), usually referred to as Auntie Susu, was Shirley's ignorant sister, Porkpie's dream girl and later fiancée. She preferred to be called "Susu" rather than her birth name, but the family, in particular Shirley, would call her Doreen whenever angry with her. In the fourth series, Susu was deported back to Jamaica; however, she was still engaged to Porkpie. In the final series of the spin-off show Porkpie, Susu had turned up out of the blue from Jamaica, after finding out about Porkpie's Lottery win in the West Indian Times newspaper. She claimed to have married an Englishman back in the Caribbean so that she could get a passport to go to England to marry Porkpie. Porkpie later found out that she had run away with all her current husband's savings, sold his electric wheelchair and stolen his passport so that he could not pursue her, and that she only came to England to marry him and claim half of his fortune. Prior to her engagement to Porkpie, she was married to (and divorced from) Maxwell, with whom she had several sons. 
 Vince (Count Prince Miller) was another assistant in the shop in the final series. He was also the drummer in the Georgetown Dreamers.
Burt (Sol Raye) was a member of The Georgetown Dreamers, a band that Desmond, Porkpie and Vince played in.
 Andrew "Spider" Webb (Robert McKewley) was Sean's best friend and had an open crush on Gloria. He was into ragga music and was an entrepreneur. Although he was Sean's best friend, Sean's family members seemed to disapprove of him and sometimes thought he was a bad influence.
 Bernie (Rhashan Stone) was the first friend that Sean made at university on his first day. He was openly gay.
 Ronni (Teohna Williams) was Gloria's best friend in series 5 and 6.
 Alex Reynolds (Chris Tummings) was Gloria's boyfriend from series 4, a strict vegetarian and an artist. Gloria and Alex moved in together towards the end of the series. It is revealed in the first episode of the Porkpie spin-off series that Alex and Gloria were still together.
 Neville "Nev" James (Treva Etienne) was a family friend who was a Police Constable, later becoming a Detective Constable CID. He also went to school with Lee and Michael as a child. He only appeared in three episodes between the second and third series.
 Lewis (Lewis St. Juste) was very often in the background, using the pay-phone in the barber shop. He has a line or two in a few episodes. He first spoke in the third episode of the second series, when Shirley asked him his name. He used the phone so often that Lee once referred to him as E.T.
 Sweetsticks is sometimes mentioned in the show although he never appears on screen. He dies during the first series, and episode 6 (entitled "Sad News") culminates with the other characters attending his funeral. He was a member of the Georgetown Dreamers, their steel pan player and is often cited by Desmond and Porkpie as having been a ladies' man. Although Sweetsticks never appeared in the show, the repercussions of his actions sometimes form important plot elements, affecting Desmond in the present day. He was revealed to be Lee's father.

Theme song
The series theme song "Don't Scratch My Soca", performed by Beaton was used in the opening credits throughout the entire run. A version without the vocals was used in the closing credits.  At the beginning of Series 5, the theme received an update, with more percussion. The instrumental was used as the basis for a song by the "Georgetown Dreamers", Desmond's old band in one episode.

The full theme was released as a 7" single on June 21, 2021.

Prejudice
Worrell was keen to show that prejudice existed not just between broad ethnic groups, but also within them.  While Matthew was the frequent butt of jokes from the West Indian characters, particularly Porkpie and Desmond, he was always keen to point out the strength of African history with his regular interjection, "There's an old African saying...".

Legacy
The show had a unique method of team writing raising the profile of some writers, such as playwright Michael J. Ellis, who later worked on other shows, including the BBC's all-black sketch show The Real McCoy, and Worrell himself who became a film writer.

Re-runs aired in the USA on BET in the early 1990s. The show was shown on NYC Media as part of their Caribbean programming on Sunday nights in the late 1990s. As of January 2007, the network still airs re-runs of Desmond's from time to time. From 1997 until late 2000, Paramount Comedy re-ran the show. Trouble, a channel in the UK, began showing re-runs of Desmond's in September 2007.

Desmond's was featured on the BBC Radio 4 programme Britain in a Box on 11 May 2013.

On 14 January 2013, The Africa Channel International (which was on Sky channel 209 & Virgin Media channel 828) relaunched Desmond's - weeknights at 7pm and 11pm. In November 2015, London Live acquired the repeat rights.

The full series was published for viewing on All 4 through YouTube. With 71 episodes, it remains Channel 4's longest running sitcom in terms of the number of episodes produced.

The complete series was added to Netflix in September 2020. On 21 February 2022, Gold started showing the series.

Media releases

Region 2 DVD
Channel 4 DVD has released the first two series on DVD in the UK. Series One was released on 1 October 2007. Series Two was released on 14 April 2008.

Region 1 DVD
Visual Entertainment has begun releasing Desmond's on DVD in Canada. To date they have released the first four series of the show on DVD. Series 1 and 2 were released on 27 March 2007. Series 3 was released on 3 November 2009. On 2 March 2010, VEI released Desmond's- The Collection: Series One to Four, a seven-disc set featuring all episodes from the first four seasons.

On demand
All six seasons are available to stream in the UK on the Channel 4 service All 4 and through the streaming services Amazon Prime and Netflix.

Follow-up
Following the death of Norman Beaton in 1994, a spin-off series was made with Porkpie in the title role. This ran for two series in 1995 and 1996.

References

External links
  - including free "on demand" video of all episodes, all series.
 
 
 
Desmond's: A sitcom that changed Britain BBC's Witness History interviews Trix Worrell.

1989 British television series debuts
1994 British television series endings
1980s British sitcoms
1990s British sitcoms
Black British sitcoms
Black British television shows
Channel 4 sitcoms
Television shows set in London
English-language television shows
Peckham
Channel 4 original programming